Mouni Roy (born 28 September 1985) is an Indian actress who primarily works in Hindi films and television. She made her acting debut in 2006, with the TV show Kyunki Saas Bhi Kabhi Bahu Thi. Roy became one of the highest-paid Hindi television actresses after portraying a shape-shifting serpent in the supernatural thriller Naagin and its sequel  Naagin 2. She is a receipent of various awards including Indian Television Academy Awards and Gold Awards.

Roy made her film debut with the Punjabi film Hero Hitler in Love (2011). She made her Hindi film debut with Gold (2018), receiving Filmfare Award for Best Female Debut nomination. Roy received critical acclaim for her performance as Junoon in Brahmāstra: Part One – Shiva (2022).

Early life and education
Roy was born in Cooch Behar, West Bengal on 28 September 1985 into a Bengali Hindu family. Her grandfather, Shekhar Chandra Roy was a well-known Jatra theatre artist. Her mother Mukti was a theatre artist, and her father Anil Roy was an office superintendent of the Cooch Behar Zilla Parishad. She did her schooling till class 12th from Kendriya Vidyalaya in Baburhat, Cooch Behar and then went to Delhi. 

She took up mass communication at Jamia Milia Islamia at her parents' insistence, but left the course midway and went to Mumbai to try her luck in the Bollywood film industry. She finished her part 1 exams and did not return to Delhi after that. Mouni had an interest in acting since her childhood and cited actresses Madhubala, Madhuri Dixit and Waheeda Rehman as her acting idols.

Career

Film and television debut (2006–2010) 
Roy started her career with the Ekta Kapoor drama Kyunki Saas Bhi Kabhi Bahu Thi in 2006, portraying Krishna Tulsi opposite Pulkit Samrat and Akashdeep Saigal. She then participated and won the first season of Zara Nachke Dikha. Then, she portrayed Shivani Sabharwal in Kasturi. In 2008, she participated in Pati Patni Aur Woh. In 2010, she played Roop in Do Saheliyaan.

Breakthrough, success and stardom in television (2011–2017) 

In 2011, Roy starred in the Punjabi movie Hero Hitler in Love. She attained fame after playing the role of Sati in Life OK's mythological series Devon Ke Dev...Mahadev from 2011 to 2014. During that time she played the lead as Meera opposite Aditya Redij in Life OK's Junoon – Aisi Nafrat Toh Kaisa Ishq in 2013. In 2014, Roy participated in the dance reality show on Colors Jhalak Dikhhla Jaa in its seventh season along with Punit Pathak.

In 2015, Roy returned to television with Ekta Kapoor's supernatural series Naagin, playing the role of Shivanya. The series topped the TRP charts, making her a household name not only in India but in other countries as well. She became one of the players of Bijlani's team Mumbai Tigers in Box Cricket League. She hosted the dance show So You Think You Can Dance on &TV. She played a double role in Season 2 of Naagin, with Karanvir Bohra playing the male lead. Her chemistry with Bijlani in season 1 and with Bohra in season 2 was highly appreciated by audience and established her as a leading actress in Indian television. In 2016, Roy voiced the role of Sita in the animated film Mahayoddha Rama. In the same year, she appeared in the song "Nachna Aunda Ni" in Tum Bin 2.

Bollywood debut and break from television (2018–present) 

In 2018, Roy made her Bollywood debut alongside Akshay Kumar in Gold directed by Reema Kagti. Her performance was praised. Hindustan Times wrote, "Mouni Roy as Akshay's wife Monobina is just the right mixture of crotchety and charming. With her grasp of Bengali, she brings that extra something to the film's milieu." Suparna Sharma of Asian Age reviewed her performance and sensuality: "Her Monobina is created out of Punjabi men and women's fetishised fantasy of married Bengali women – snappy and scolding, but also sexy and sultry." With global earnings of 1.5 billion, Gold emerged as a commercial success and became first Indian film to have a theatrical release in South Arabia.

Roy followed the success of Gold with an item number named "Gali Gali" in December 2018; it featured in the Hindi version of K.G.F: Chapter 1. The song was a recreation of a track from Tridev (1989). 

In May 2019, she made a cameo appearance in the final few episodes of Naagin 3 as Mahanaagrani Shivangi.

Roy's first film release in 2019 was Romeo Akbar Walter, which also starred John Abraham and Jackie Shroff. Her performance as a R&AW spy drew mixed reviews. A Bollywood Hungama review stated, "Mouni Roy has an interesting part to essay. Though she does well, her character gets a raw deal." Saibal Chatterjee of NDTV criticised the length of her role: "Mouni Roy, cast as the hero's colleague and beloved, pops up now and then in an eminently forgettable role." Romeo Akbar Walter underperformed at the box office. Her next film, Made in China was released on the occasion of Diwali. Roy took Gujarati lessons for the film in which she enacted a disturbed housewife. In a review by Vibha Maru of India Today, her performance was described as "a surprise package. Though given a small role, Mouni comes with much power, owning every bit of the screen time she gets in the film." Made in China faced competition from Housefull 4 and Saand Ki Aankh, but proved a commercial success. 

In 2020, she appeared as a pregnant R&AW spy named Uma Kulkarni in her first OTT feature film London Confidential. Though critics were not impressed by the film, they praised Roy. Rediff.com wrote, "Mouni Roy shows conviction in playing her part and is in a different avatar from her earlier performances in Gold and Made in China." In 2022, Roy appeared as judge in the fifth season of the reality show Dance India Dance Li'l Masters.

Roy was slated to play the female lead in Nawazuddin Siddiqui-starrer Bole Chudiyan, but she quit after clashes with the filmmakers. She played the main antagonist "Junoon" in the 2022 film Brahmāstra: Part One – Shiva co-starring Ranbir Kapoor, Alia Bhatt and Amitabh Bachchan. It released on 9 September and Roy received rave reviews from critics and audience alike. India Today noted, "Mouni Roy as the villain is terrific and breaks the Naagin stigma with this career-altering performance."

Roy will also be making a guest appearance in Vikas Bahl's Ganpath: Part One (2022), and has been reportedly signed as the leading lady in Sanjay Gupta's sports drama, opposite Harshvardhan Rane and Meezaan Jafri, and Milan Luthria's web series based on Arnab Ray's book Sultan of Delhi: Ascension, also featuring Tahir Raj Bhasin and Neha Sharma.

Personal life
Roy has been awarded the UAE golden visa due to her frequent visits to the country.

Following three years of relationship, Roy and Dubai-based businessman Suraj Nambiar got married in traditional Bengali and Malayali ceremonies on 27 January 2022, in Panaji, Goa.

Other work and media image

Roy has established herself as one of the most popular and highest paid television actress in India. Times of India termed Naagin as a "game-changer" for Roy. Post the release  of Brahmāstra: Part One – Shiva, Mayukh Majumdar of Filmfare termed her "the undisputed star of the movie". Financial Express stated that Roy's Junoon will be the "best antagonist Bollywood has seen in a while".

Roy has frequently featured on Times' 50 Most Desirable Women list. She ranked 35th in 2017, 32nd in 2018, 41st in 2019 and 44th in 2020. She was placed 3rd in Times 20 Most Desirable Women on TV list of 2017. She is a prominent celebrity endorser for brands and products including Bryan & Candy, Joy and Spawake.

Roy also supports a number of social causes. During the COVID-19 crisis, she donated a sum for the people in need. In 2020, after the cyclone Amphan, she joined hands with an NGO and auctioned her paintings in order to raise funds. Roy also donated to the Iskcon Foundation, for medical facilities in Mayapur in 2021.

Roy and her husband Suraj Nambiar launched "Ultimate Gurus", a global education platform in 2022. In March 2023, Roy performed in various cities in the United States for "The Entertainers" tour, alongside Akshay Kumar, Disha Patani, Nora Fatehi, Sonam Bajwa, Aparshakti Khurana, Stebin Ben and Zahrah S Khan.

Filmography

Films 
All films are in Hindi unless otherwise noted.

Television

Special appearances

Music videos

Accolades

See also 
 List of Hindi television actresses 
 List of Indian television actresses
List of Indian film actresses
List of Hindi film actresses

References

External links 

 Mouni Roy at IMDb
 

1985 births
Living people
Indian television actresses
People from Cooch Behar
Actresses in Hindi television
Actresses in Hindi cinema
Indian film actresses
21st-century Indian actresses
Bengali actresses
People from Cooch Behar district